In geometry a conoid is a ruled surface, whose rulings (lines) fulfill the additional conditions:
(1) All rulings are parallel to a plane, the directrix plane.
(2) All rulings intersect a fixed line, the axis.
 
The conoid is a right conoid if its axis is perpendicular to its directrix plane. Hence all rulings are perpendicular to the axis.

Because of (1) any conoid is a Catalan surface and can be represented parametrically by 
 
Any curve  with fixed parameter  is a ruling,  describes the directrix and the vectors  are  all parallel to the directrix plane. The planarity of the vectors  can be represented by 
.
If the directrix is a circle, the conoid is called a circular conoid.

The term conoid was already used by Archimedes in his treatise On Conoids and Spheroides.

Examples

Right circular conoid 
The parametric representation

describes a right circular conoid with the unit circle of the x-y-plane as directrix and a directrix plane, which is parallel to the y--z-plane. Its axis is the line 

Special features: 
 The intersection with a horizontal plane is an ellipse.
  is an implicit representation. Hence the right circular conoid is a surface of degree 4. 
 Kepler's rule gives for a right circular conoid  with radius  and height  the exact volume: .

The implicit representation is fulfilled by the points of the line , too. For these points there exist no tangent planes. Such points are called singular.

Parabolic conoid 

The parametric representation

 
describes a parabolic conoid with the equation . The conoid has a parabola as directrix, the y-axis as axis and a plane parallel to the x-z-plane as directrix plane. It is used by architects as roof surface (s. below).

The parabolic conoid has no singular points.

Further examples 
hyperbolic paraboloid 
Plücker conoid 
Whitney Umbrella
helicoid

Applications

Mathematics 
There are a lot of conoids with singular points, which are investigated in algebraic geometry.

Architecture 
Like other ruled surfaces conoids are of high interest with architects, because they can be built using beams or bars. Right conoids can be manufactured easily: one threads bars onto an axis such that they can be rotated around this axis, only. Afterwards one deflects the bars by a directrix and generates a conoid (s. parabolic conoid).

External links 
mathworld: Plücker conoid

References
 A. Gray, E. Abbena, S. Salamon, Modern differential geometry of curves and surfaces with Mathematica, 3rd ed. Boca Raton, FL:CRC Press, 2006.  
 Vladimir Y. Rovenskii, Geometry of curves and surfaces with MAPLE 

Surfaces
Geometric shapes